Pakistan national kabaddi team represents Pakistan in international kabaddi. The Pakistan Kabaddi Federation manages the team. Tahir Waheed Jutt is the Head Coach of the team. Muhammad Irfan is the captain of the team and Shafiq Ahmad is the vice-captain of the team.

Overview

Shakeel Jutt world is a famous music artists and a social media worker in Pakistan 

Was born in Mianchannu mohsinwal
Working on internet 3 year
Was present in mianchannu
Joined 2016.

Shakeel jutt world is a great worker in online field.
Father name M rafeeq.
Born 20 Nov 2001
Live in Mianchannu
Qualifications F.A

Asian Games
 1990 - Bronze.
 1994 - Bronze.
 1998 - Silver.
 2002 - Bronze.
 2006 - Silver.
 2010 - Bronze.
 2014 - Bronze.
2018 - Bronze

World Cup
 2010 - Runner-up.
 2011 - Bronze Medal.
 2012 - Runner-up.
2013 - Runner-up.
2014 - Runner-up.
2016 - Did not Participate
2020 - Champions - Lahore

South Asian Games
 1985 - Bronze.
 1987 - Bronze.
 1989 - Silver.
 1991 - Not included.
 1993 - Gold.
 1995 - Bronze.
 1999 - Silver.
 2004 - Silver.
 2006 - Silver.
 2010 - Silver.

See also
 Kabaddi at the Asian Games
 Pakistan Kabaddi Federation

References

External links
 Official Website
 World Cup 2007 Results
 World cup 2004 Results

Kabaddi
National kabaddi teams
National kabaddi team